Larry James Kulick  (born February 24, 1966) is an American prelate of the Catholic Church who has been serving as bishop of the Diocese of Greensburg in Pennsylvania since 2021. He became the first priest from the diocese to be appointed its bishop.

Biography

Early life 
Larry Kulick was born on February 24, 1966, in Natrona Heights, Pennsylvania, to Larry J. Kulick Sr. and Myrna Dolores Coleman Kulick. He grew up in Leechburg, Pennsylvania, and he attended St. Joseph High School, also in Natrona Heights. Kulick then entered Saint Vincent College in Unity Township, Pennsylvania. and then later Saint Vincent Seminary in Latrobe, Pennsylvania.

Priesthood 
On May 16, 1992, Kulick was ordained to the priesthood for the Diocese of Greensburg by Bishop Anthony G. Bosco. He received his Licentiate in Canon Law in 2012 from the Catholic University of America.

Kulick was given the title of monsignor by the Vatican on May 21, 2014. He has been a member of the Order of the Holy Sepulchre since 2011 and was elevated to knight commander on October 31, 2015. Kulick served as diocesan administrator when Bishop Malesic, was appointed bishop of the Diocese of Cleveland in 2020.

Bishop of Greensburg 
Pope Francis appointed Kulick bishop for the Diocese of Greensburg on December 18, 2020. He was consecrated as a bishop on February 11, 2021, at Blessed Sacrament Cathedral by Archbishop Nelson J. Perez as principal consecrator, and Bishop Edward C. Malesic and Bishop Emeritus Lawrence Brandt as co-consecrators. 

Kulick is of Slovak heritage, and is active in the First Catholic Slovak Union, where he served as a chaplain for over 25 years. His coat of arms closely resembles the coat of arms of Slovakia. He is also a classic car enthusiast, and has hosted many classic car shows and rides for both personal enjoyment and parish fundraisers. He is especially fond of cars made by the Pontiac Motor Company, and owns a 1966 Pontiac LeMans.

Distinctions

Foreign orders
: Knight of the Order of the Holy Sepulchre

See also

 Catholic Church hierarchy
 Catholic Church in the United States
 Historical list of the Catholic bishops of the United States
 List of Catholic bishops of the United States
 Lists of patriarchs, archbishops, and bishops

References

External links

Diocese of Greensburg Official Site

Episcopal succession

 

1966 births
Living people
People from Harrison Township, Allegheny County, Pennsylvania
American people of Slovak descent
Saint Vincent College alumni
American Roman Catholic priests
Bishops appointed by Pope Francis
Members of the Order of the Holy Sepulchre
Knights of the Holy Sepulchre